Majed Al-Shamrani is a Saudi international Referee. He governs the Saudi Professional League and King's Cup matches and matches of Arab Club Champions Cup.

References 

Saudi Arabian football referees
Living people
Year of birth missing (living people)